Beskiocephala is a genus of Bristle flies in the family Tachinidae. There is at least one described species in Beskiocephala, B. flava.

References

Further reading

External links

 
 

Tachinidae